Chaozz is a Czech hip hop group active from 1995 to 2002, during which time they released four studio albums. They reformed in 2017 and have since published one single.

Career
Chaozz was formed in 1995 by musicians Bass, MC Deph, Rusty, Fugaz, and DJ Smog. Bass and Rusty had previously been members of another hip hop group, UNIT, established in 1993, and MC Deph had released a solo record before working with Fugaz on a project called Flavamatic. UNIT disbanded in 1994, with Bass and Rusty joining DJ Smog to form the group Chaozz. Shortly afterward, the two groups merged under the name Chaozz.

The group began to achieve success after meeting Ivo Pospíšil, a record store owner who had contacts at PolyGram. In 1996, they released their first album, ...a nastal chaos. Following this, they worked with Slovak group No Gravity on the track "Chaozz věci", which was used in several commercials and received airplay on TV Nova as well as on radio.

In 2002, after four albums, the group disbanded. Deph joined former UNIT colleague DJ Skupla to form another group, Prago Union, and Bass is a DJ who performs under the name Ba2s. In 2017, Chaozz got back together. A year later, they released the single "Průvan", their first original material since reforming.

Band members

Current members
 Bass, aka Ba2s – rap
 MC Deph, aka MC Kato – rap
 Rusty – rap
 Fugaz – rap
 DJ Skupla – DJ

Past members
 DJ Smog – DJ (1994–97)

Discography

Studio albums
 ...a nastal chaos (1996)
 Zprdeleklika (1997)
 P.E.S. (1999)
 Sakum prdum (2001)

EPs
 Planeta Opic (1996)
 Zprdelevinyl (1997)
 Sekec Mazec (2001)

Compilations
 Inventura (2002)
 20 Let Chaozzu (2013)

References

External links
 
 Chaozz on Discogs.com
 DJ Ba2s official website

Czech hip hop groups
1995 establishments in the Czech Republic
Musical groups from Prague
Musical groups established in 1995
Musical groups disestablished in 2002